Leptopsammia is a genus of stony cup corals in the family Dendrophylliidae. They are azooxanthellate, meaning that they do not contain symbiotic photosynthetic algae as do many species of coral.

Species
The following species are listed in the World Register of Marine Species (WoRMS):
Leptopsammia britannica (Duncan, 1870)
Leptopsammia chevalieri Zibrowius, 1980
Leptopsammia columna Folkeson, 1919
Leptopsammia crassa van der Horst, 1922
Leptopsammia formosa (Gravier, 1915)
Leptopsammia poculum (Alcock, 1902)
Leptopsammia pruvoti Lacaze-Duthiers, 1897
Leptopsammia queenslandiae Wells, 1964
Leptopsammia stokesiana Milne Edwards & Haime, 1848
Leptopsammia trinitatis Hubbard & Wells, 1987

References

Dendrophylliidae
Scleractinia genera